Hajari is a 2020 Indian Marathi language film directed by Kishor Pandurang Belekar. The movie was released on 9 February 2020.

References

External links